Manuel Gerardo Corona Venegas (born 7 January 1983 in Konstanz) is a German born-Mexican former footballer.

He last played as a goalkeeper for Irapuato FC from 2008 to 2013.

External links
 
  
Profile at BDFA

1983 births
Living people
Mexican footballers
German footballers
Association football goalkeepers
Salamanca F.C. footballers
Irapuato F.C. footballers
Club Atlético Zacatepec players
Ballenas Galeana Morelos footballers
Ascenso MX players
Footballers from Baden-Württemberg
German people of Mexican descent
Sportspeople of Mexican descent
People from Konstanz
Sportspeople from Freiburg (region)